Cluster Computing: the Journal of Networks, Software Tools and Applications is a peer-reviewed scientific journal on parallel processing, distributed computing systems, and computer communication networks. The journal was established in 1998.

According to the Journal Citation Reports, the journal had a 2020 impact factor of 1.809. The editor-in-chief is Salim Hariri (University of Arizona).

References

External links
 

Computer science journals
Cluster computing
Publications established in 1998
English-language journals
Springer Science+Business Media academic journals
Quarterly journals